A Real Man (Swedish: Karl för sin hatt) is a 1940 Swedish comedy film directed by Schamyl Bauman and starring Adolf Jahr, Birgit Tengroth and Sigurd Wallén. It was shot at the Centrumateljéerna Studios in Stockholm. The film's sets were designed by the art director Arthur Spjuth.

Cast
 Adolf Jahr as Ola Hansson
 Birgit Tengroth as 	Gun Bergström
 Sigurd Wallén as 	Algot Bergström
 Gull Natorp as 	Mrs. Betty Bergström
 Emil Fjellström as 	Uncle Stor-Ola Hansson
Stig Järrel as Jimmy
 Vera Valdor as Tilda
 Gösta Cederlund as 	Head of the Department
 Anna-Greta Adolphson as 	Dinner Guest 
 Ann-Margret Bergendahl as 	Gun's Friend 
 Margareta Bergfeldt a s	Ulla 
 Betty Bjurström as 	Bergström's Maid
 Gunnar Björnstrand as 	Clerk 
 Gösta Bodin as 	Clerk
 Ingrid Borthen as 	Ann Marie 
 John Botvid as 	Recording Clerk 
Gudrun Brost as 	Monica 
 Ernst Brunman as 	Civil Servant 
 Åke Engfeldt as 	Krister 
 Ziri-Gun Eriksson as 	Sonja
 Gustaf Färingborg as 	Kurt 
 Helga Hallén as 	Gun's Friend 
 Torsten Hillberg as Clerk 
 Inga Hodell as 	Miss Dahl 
 Nils Hultgren as 	Civil Servant 
 Åke Johansson as 	Ville 
 Barbro Kollberg as Barbro 
 Aurore Palmgren as Hulda 
 Willy Peters as 	Nils 
 Gun Robertson as 	Dinner Guest 
 Greta Tegnér as 	Maid 
 Olov Wigren as Clerk 
 Signe Wirff as 	Lady Partner at Table

References

Bibliography 
 Per Olov Qvist & Peter von Bagh. Guide to the Cinema of Sweden and Finland. Greenwood Publishing Group, 2000.

External links 
 

1940 films
1940 comedy films
Swedish comedy films
1940s Swedish-language films
Films directed by Schamyl Bauman
Films set in Stockholm
1940s Swedish films